is a Japanese politician of the Democratic Party of Japan, a member of the House of Councillors in the Diet (national legislature). A native of Kitakami, Iwate and graduate of the University of Tokyo, he joined the Ministry of Agriculture, Forestry and Fisheries in 1977, attending the Iowa State University in the United States as a ministry official. In 2001, he left the ministry and was elected to the House of Councillors for the first time.

On July 5, 2011, after the abrupt resignation of Ryū Matsumoto, Hirano was named the Minister of State for Disaster Management, in the aftermath of the Great East Japan earthquake in his native Tōhoku region.  He was reappointed to the post in September 2011 in the cabinet of newly appointed prime minister Yoshihiko Noda.

References

External links 
  in Japanese.

1954 births
Living people
Members of the House of Councillors (Japan)
Democratic Party of Japan politicians
Noda cabinet
Politicians from Iwate Prefecture
University of Tokyo alumni